Habiba Zehi Ben Romdhane was Tunisia's health minister. She took office in the interim Tunisian government which began on January 28, 2011, after protests had dislodged a longstanding authoritarian government.

Habiba Zehi Ben Romdhane earned a public health degree from the Faculty of Medicine at the University of Tunis (1978) and trained further in public health at Laval University (1979), the University of Chicago (1981) and the University of Tokyo (1988). She is a professor of preventive medicine with the Faculty of Medicine at the University of Tunis and head of the Laboratory for Research on the epidemiology and prevention of cardiovascular diseases and has worked with the World Health Organization. In 2001, she received the Award of Maghreb societies of Medical Sciences. She is a founding member of the Tunisian League of Epidemiology, and other national and international medical societies.

Habiba Zehi Ben Romdhane cofounded the Tunisian Association of Democratic Women and the Tunisian Association for Development Research, and the Tunisian chapter of Amnesty International.

Habiba Zehi Ben Romdhane was born in 1950 in El Ksar in the Gafsa Governorate of Tunisia. Her husband, Mahmoud Ben Romdhane, is an economist and a member of the Ettajdid Movement political party.

References 

1950 births
Living people
People from Gafsa Governorate
Tunisian public health doctors
Academic staff of Tunis University
Tunisian women physicians
University of Tokyo alumni
Université Laval alumni
University of Chicago alumni
Tunis University alumni
Women government ministers of Tunisia
Health ministers of Tunisia
21st-century Tunisian women politicians
21st-century Tunisian politicians
Women public health doctors